Divide/Conquer (pronounced "Divide and Conquer") is an American film and television production company founded in 2013 by Adam Hendricks and Greg Gilreath. It is known for producing films such as Lucky, Cam, Black Christmas, Freaky, The Voyeurs, Vengeance and M3GAN.

Overview
Divide/Conquer oversees the development and production of budget films. Its first films were V/H/S: Viral, Lucky, Like. Share. Follow. and Totem. It is also known for producing multiple projects with Jason Blum and Blumhouse Productions. In 2022, their film Freaky was featured in a maze at Universal's Halloween Horror Nights and their film M3GAN in 2023.

Filmography

Films

Upcoming films

Short films

Television

References

External links 
 

Mass media companies established in 2013
Film production companies of the United States